The Nesset Parsonage lies  southwest of Eidsvåg on the south side of Langfjorden in the municipality of Nesset, Norway.

The parsonage is especially known for being the boyhood home of the writer Bjørnstjerne Bjørnson. His father, Peder Bjørnson, served as the parish priest here from 1837 to 1853. Bjørnstjerne lived in Nesset until 1844, when he moved to Molde and started high school. The rural community and nature at the parsonage in Romsdal had a strong impact on  Bjørnson's poetry.

The parsonage has been developed in a partnership between the Romsdal Museum as a museum-based consultant and the Norwegian Church Endowment (Ovf), which owns the property. The parsonage is the municipality's millennium site.

Gallery

References

External links
 
 Nesset Parsonage at the Norwegian Directorate for Cultural Heritage website
 Nesset prestegard – Bjørnstjerne Bjørnsons Barndomshjem (Nesset Parsonage: Bjørnstjerne Bjørnson's Boyhood Home) at the Romsdal Museum website

Buildings and structures in Møre og Romsdal
Cultural heritage of Norway
Farms in Møre og Romsdal
Clergy houses